The El Dorado Missouri Pacific Depot is a former passenger train station in El Dorado, Kansas, United States.  It is a one-story, red-brick structure with a red-tile roof and wide, overhanging eaves designed by E. M. Tucker, Chief Engineer of the Missouri Pacific, in the Mission architectural style.

History
Constructed in 1918, the depot served the Missouri Pacific Railroad, on a freight-passenger line that ran east from Wichita to El Dorado then on to Eureka Yates Center, Durand, Iola, Moran, Bronson, and Ft. Scott.

It was added to the National Register of Historic Places in 1994.

See also
 National Register of Historic Places listings in Butler County, Kansas

References

Railway stations on the National Register of Historic Places in Kansas
Railway stations in the United States opened in 1918
Former Missouri Pacific Railroad stations
Former railway stations in Kansas
El Dorado, Kansas
National Register of Historic Places in Butler County, Kansas
Mission Revival architecture in Kansas